Civilization and Its Discotheques is the sole LP release of Los Angeles art rock band The Fibonaccis, released in 1987 on Blue Yonder Sounds. The album's title is an obvious reference to Sigmund Freud's 1929 book Civilization and Its Discontents.

Like all of the Fibonaccis' work, Civilization and Its Discotheques is out of print, though the album is currently available for download on the band's official website. The majority of its tracks were later featured on the band's 1992 retrospective compilation album, Repressed - The Best of the Fibonaccis.

Track listing

Song information
"Narcissist" is based on the book The Culture of Narcissism by Christopher Lasch.
"Crickets" is a spoken word rendition of an untitled Emily Dickinson poem.
"Leroy" is a spoken word piece composed of dialogue from The Bad Seed.

Personnel

The Fibonaccis
John Dentino - piano, Mellotron, synthesizer, vocoder
Magie Song - vocals
Joseph Berardi - drums, percussion, cello (track 10)
Tom Corey - bass guitar, mandolin, guitar (tracks 5, 10, 11 and 12), slide guitar (track 9)
Ron Stringer - vocals (tracks 3, 4 and 8), guitar (tracks 1, 2, 3, 4 and 7)

Guest musicians
Bruce Fowler - trombone ("Medicine Waltz")
Lynn Johnston - bass clarinet, oboe ("Medicine Waltz")
Mike Price - trumpet ("Medicine Waltz")
Bill Rhea - violin ("Some Men", "Old Mean Ed Gein")
Stan Ridgway - harmonica ("Old Mean Ed Gein")
Bill Roper - tuba ("Medicine Waltz")

Production
Engineered by Steve Sharp and Charles Ramirez
Recorded at Juniper Studios in Burbank, California and Casbah Studios in Fullerton, California
Mixed at Juniper Studios. 
Mastered by Jeff Sanders at KM Records in Burbank, California.

References

External links
The Fibonaccis Official Website

1987 debut albums
The Fibonaccis albums